Maria McCambridge (born 10 July 1975 in Dublin) is an Irish long-distance runner who competed mostly in the 3000 and 5000 meters before moving up to the marathon. She represented her country at the 2004 Summer Olympics, as well as three outdoor and three indoor World Championships.

Competition record

Personal bests
Outdoor
1500 metres – 4:11.73 (Dublin 2005)
3000 metres – 8:50.40 (Madrid 2005)
5000 metres – 15:05.86 (Heusden-Zolder 2004)
10,000 metres – 33:22.79 (Dublin 2012)
Half-Marathon – 1:12:26 (Charleville 2014) 
Marathon – 2:35:28 (Dublin 2012)
3000 metres steeplechase – 10:20.6 (Glasgow 2007)
Indoor
3000 metres – 8:56.48 (Belfast 2004)

References

1975 births
Living people
Irish female long-distance runners
Olympic athletes of Ireland
Athletes (track and field) at the 2004 Summer Olympics
Sportspeople from Dublin (city)
Irish female marathon runners
Irish female steeplechase runners
World Athletics Championships athletes for Ireland